is a progressive and left-wing populist political party in Japan founded by actor-turned-politician Taro Yamamoto in April 2019. The party was formed by left-wing members of the Liberal Party who opposed its merger with the Democratic Party for the People. The party won more than 4% of the vote after contesting the House of Councilors election in July 2019, gaining two seats only about three and a half months after the formation of the party.

The party is variously described as being anti-austerity, anti-establishment, and anti-nuclear power as well as supporting animal welfare, minority rights, and economic interventionism.

History

Founding
Taro Yamamoto, a member of the House of Councillors for Tokyo, founded the party on 1 April 2019. This was with the intent of standing multiple candidates, including himself, in the upcoming House of Councillors election later in the year. On 10 April, Yamamoto held a press conference and announced the party's platform.

2019 House of Councillors election
The party stood multiple candidates in the 2019 House of Councillors election. The party won 2.2 million votes in the national PR block, exceeding the 2% threshold needed to be recognised as a political party, and securing two seats. Nearly one million votes were cast for Yamamoto personally; however, because the party had nominated Yasuhiko Funago and Eiko Kimura, both of whom have disabilities, ahead of him in the party list, Yamamoto did not win a seat. The National Diet Building was adapted to allow barrier-free access for wheelchair users.

Notable party members include university professor Ayumi Yasutomi and former deputy representative of the North Korean abduction liaison Toru Hasuike.

2020 Tokyo gubernatorial election 
Yamamoto was one of the 22 candidates participating in the 2020 Tokyo gubernatorial election, coming in third place with 10.72% of the votes. The party promises included a direct cash handout programme due to the COVID-19 pandemic.

2021 Japanese general election 
Yamamoto joined with the leaders of the Constitutional Democratic Party, Japanese Communist Party, and Social Democratic Party in running a joint opposition coalition based on common policy goals. Yamamoto, who had been formerly running in Tokyo's 8th district, withdrew to run in the Tokyo PR block to avoid vote splitting against the CDP's Harumi Yoshida. The withdrawal came following pushback from local residents, who were hesitant to vote for Yamamoto, a "parachute candidate," over Yoshida, who had been active within the community for many years prior. The party further withdrew 7 candidates as part of the joint platform to avoid vote splitting between the opposition parties, accounting for 40% of Reiwa Shinsengumi's planned slate of candidates.

There are 20 other candidates besides Yamamoto, running under the Reiwa Shinsengumi banner. One of them is Takashi Takai, who was expelled from the Constitutional Democratic Party of Japan after ignoring COVID-19 state of emergency laws. Takai is Reiwa Shinsengumi's only sitting legislator, formerly elected on the CDP list for the Chūgoku proportional representation block. Takai will be running at Shiga Prefecture's 3rd District.

2022 House of Councillors election 
Yamamoto announced his resignation from the House of Representatives he was elected to in 2021 general election, and contested in Tokyo metropolitan constituency. Reiwa gained three seats in the election: Yamamoto winning a seat in Tokyo, along with two other candidates who took up seats in the nationwide proportional representation block.

Policies 
In a press conference held shortly after the founding of the party, Yamamoto announced that his party would push for the abolition of the consumption tax and instead, make the corporation tax a progressive tax and increase government bonds. In addition, he said that the party is against the construction of the Henoko base.

The party has announced that it would reverse/abolish many of the laws that were revised or passed by Prime Minister Shinzō Abe if elected, including the pre-emptive anti-terrorism law such as martial law State Secrecy Law and the 2015 Japanese military legislation.

Leader

Election results

House of Representatives

House of Councillors

Tokyo gubernatorial

Tokyo prefectural

See also
 Modern Monetary Theory
 New Deal (France)

Notes

References

2019 establishments in Japan
Political parties established in 2019
Political parties in Japan
Animal welfare organizations based in Japan
Anti-nuclear organizations
Disability organizations based in Japan
Disability rights organizations
Economic progressivism
Left-wing parties in Asia
Left-wing populism
LGBT political advocacy groups in Japan
Liberal parties in Japan
Progressive parties
Progressive parties in Japan
Populism in Japan
Social liberal parties
Political parties supporting universal basic income